McDonald Ridge is a mostly ice-covered ridge between Johnston Peak and Douglas Peak, about  southeast of Mount Biscoe in Enderby Land, Antarctica. It was plotted from air photos taken from Australian National Antarctic Research Expeditions aircraft in 1956, and was named by the Antarctic Names Committee of Australia for K.R. McDonald, a radio officer at Mawson Station in 1961.

References

External links

Ridges of Enderby Land